Bothrops lutzi, the Cerrado lancehead, is a species of venomous snake in the  family Viperidae. The species is endemic to Central eastern  Brazil. Within the country, it can be found in states such as: Minas  Gerais, Bahia,  Goiás,  Tocantins, Piauí,  and  Ceará. The South American viper has sparked an interest from the scientific community due to its venom, as it is believed to have some therapeutic potential. Scientists have found that the venom carried by B. lutzi has antibacterial and antiparasitic effects, which can help fight against microbial resistance by medical patients, as well as parasitic diseases like leishmaniosis and Chagas’ disease.

Etymology
The specific name, lutzi, is in honor of Adolfo Lutz of the Instituto Oswaldo Cruz, who collected the type specimen, upon which Miranda-Ribeiro based his new species description. Adolfo Lutz was the father of Brazilian herpetologist Bertha Lutz.

References

Further reading
Amaral A (1923). "New Genera and Species of Snakes". Proceedings of the New England Zoölogical Club 8: 85-105. (Bothrops iglesiasi, new species, pp. 97–99).
Miranda Ribeiro [sic] A (1915). "Lachesis lutzi, Uma variedade de L. pictus Tschudi ". Archivos do Museu Nacional, Rio de Janeiro 17 (3): 3-4. (Lachesis lutzi, new species). (in Portuguese).

lutzi
Endemic fauna of Brazil
Reptiles described in 1915